Acivicin is an analog of glutamine. It is an inhibitor of gamma-glutamyl transferase.

It is a fermentation product of Streptomyces sviceus.  It interferes with glutamate metabolism and inhibits glutamate dependent synthesis of enzymes, and is thereby potentially helpful in  treatment of solid tumors.

After its discovery in 1972, acivicin was studied as an anti-cancer agent, but trials were unsuccessful due to toxicity.

Research
An in vitro study showed that Acivicin at a concentration of 5 μM Acivicin inhibited by 78% the growth of human pancreatic carcinoma cells (MIA PaCa-2) after 72 hours in continuous culture. It was also found that acivicin at a concentration of 450 μM irreversibly inactivated MIA PaCa-2 γ-glutamyl transpeptidase (10 nmol/min/106 cells) with an inactivation half-life of 80 minutes.

Phase I studies
Phase I dose escalating studies conducted in 23 cancer patients administered acivicin with a concomitant 96-h i.v. infusion of a mixture of 16 amino acids showed reversible, dose-limiting CNS toxicity, characterized  by lethargy, confusion and decreased mental status.

References

External links
 
 

Amino acid derivatives
Isoxazolines
Organochlorides
Abandoned drugs